English Rugby Union Midland Division - Midlands 6 East (NE) is an English Rugby Union League.

Midlands 6 East (NE) is made up of teams from around the East Midlands of England who play home and away matches throughout a winter season. As with many low level they are often subject to re-structure

Promoted teams move up to Midlands 5 East (North).  Teams that are second place at the end of the season go into a play off with the second placed team in Midlands 6 East (NW).

Teams 2008-2009

Bourne 
Cleethorpes 
Keyworth 
North Hykeham
Ollerton
Skegness

Teams 2007-2008

Bourne 
Cleethorpes 
North Hykeham
Ollerton
Skegness 
Worksop

See also

 English rugby union system

7